The following is a list of Grammy Awards winners and nominees from Ireland:

References

Irish

 Grammy
Grammy
Grammy